Khémisset is a province in the Moroccan economic region of Rabat-Salé-Kénitra. Its population in 2004 is 521,815 
This town was founded in 1924 on the site of a military outpost on the road from Rabat to Fes now a provincial capital Khemisset is also the capital of the confederation of the Berber-speaking Zemmour tribes.
This is a good place to stop since there are many cafes and restaurants. The town also has a crafts cooperative where you can buy regional specialities, such as carpets and mats woven in palm fibre or wool. Every Tuesday Khemisset is the venue for one of the most important country souks in Morocco, with almost 1900 stalls
The major cities and towns are: 
 Khemisset
 Mâaziz
 Oulmes
 Rommani
 Sidi Allal El Bahraoui
 Tidass
 Tiflet

Subdivisions
The province is divided administratively into the following:

References

 
Khémisset Province
1924 establishments in Africa